I'm going to search is a 1966 Soviet drama film directed by Igor Dobrolyubov.

Plot 
The film tells about the life of the scientist Andrei Gusarov against the backdrop of the difficult thirties for him, as well as the Great Patriotic War and the first launch of an artificial Earth satellite.

Cast 
 Georgi Zhzhyonov as Andrey Gusarov
 Lev Durov as Aleksey Ivanov
 Pyotr Shcherbakov as Pavel Bakanov
 Aleksandr Grechanyy as Sergey Shirokov
 Vladimir Yemelyanov as Colonel Itsenko
 Lev Zolotukhin as Kuchumov
 Lev Ivanov as Nikolay Bogomolov
 Irina Brazgovka as Valya
 Igor Komarov as Svyatoslav Novoseltsev
 Vladimir Marenkov as Semyon Petrovich
 Lidiya Malyukova as Lyudmila Georgiyevna (as L. Malyukova)
 Boris Novikov as Glotov
 Daniil Netrebin as Cinematographer
 Yevelina Ovchinnikova as Klavochka
 Yevgeny Teterin as Kirill Golovin
 Mikhail Fyodorovskiy as Designer (as T. Fyodorovskiy)
 Stanislav Fesyunov as Flyer
 Oleg Khromenkov as Flyer
 Vladimir Nosik as Tourist in the Kremlin (uncredited)

References

External links 
 

1966 films
1960s Russian-language films
Soviet drama films
1966 drama films